KLCW-LP (105.5 FM) was a radio station licensed to Hailey, Idaho, United States, carrying a Religious broadcasting format. The station was owned by The Life Church Wood River Inc.

The station's license was cancelled by the Federal Communications Commission on November 5, 2019, due to KLCW-LP having been silent since August 26, 2018.

References

External links
 

LCW-LP
LCW-LP
Radio stations established in 2006
2006 establishments in Idaho
Defunct radio stations in the United States
Radio stations disestablished in 2019
2019 disestablishments in Idaho
Defunct religious radio stations in the United States
LCW-LP